Filipa Areosa (born 1990) is a Portuguese film and television actress, best known for her appearances in TV series, including O Mundo ao Contrario (2013), Morangos com Açucar (2012), Os Filhos do Rock, Aqui Tão Longe(2016), Mar Salgado(2014–2015) and Nazaré (telenovela) (2019-2020). She also has made appearances in films, including Morangos Com Açucar – O Filme, A Uma Hora Incerta and other short movies.

Filmography

Film

Television

Trivia 
She shaved her head for a role in Amor Maior.

References

External links

1992 births
Living people
21st-century Portuguese actresses
Portuguese film actresses
Portuguese television actresses
People from Santarém, Portugal